Werneria pumila is a species of flowering plant in the family Asteraceae. It is found only in Ecuador. Its natural habitats are subtropical or tropical high-altitude shrubland and subtropical or tropical high-altitude grassland. It is threatened by habitat loss.

References

Senecioneae
Endemic flora of Ecuador
Taxa named by Carl Sigismund Kunth
Least concern plants
Taxonomy articles created by Polbot